The New Year's Rate Plan is a 2008 Russian comedy film directed by Evgeny Bedarev.

Plot 
Today, technological advances often give birth to miracles, and Ded Moroz may turn out to be a usual phone seller.

Cast 
 Valeriya Lanskaya as Alena
 Maksim Matveyev as Andrey
 Svetlana Sukhanova as Rita
 Evgeniy Slavsky as Vadim
 Boris Korchevnikov as Pashka
 Roman Polyanskiy
 Miroslava Karpovich as Olechka
 Ekaterina Malikova as Masha
 Mark Bogatyryov as Maks
 Stanislav Belyaev as Danilov (as Stas Belyaev)

References

External links 
 

2008 films
2000s Russian-language films
Russian romantic comedy films
Russian fantasy comedy films